Lai King is an MTR rapid transit station in the suburb of Lai King in the Kwai Tsing District. The station is located above ground on a viaduct and is an interchange for the Tsuen Wan and Tung Chung lines.

The former is regarded as orthodox per the Kangxi dictionary. The same goes for Lai Chi Kok station which shares the same character.

History

The station was built to serve the adjacent public housing complex and the container terminal on the coast. When the rail link to Lantau Island was announced, Lai King was chosen to be the interchange between the Tsuen Wan line and the then proposed .

During the construction of the Tung Chung line platforms, the layout of the station was significantly altered. New tracks were added above the existing tracks to provide a cross-platform interchange between the Tung Chung and Tsuen Wan lines. The outbound Tsuen Wan line trains now stops on the same level as the outbound Tung Chung line trains, and the same goes for the inbound services.

An additional pair of tracks was constructed to permit the  trains to bypass Lai King without stopping. The station is made up of six tracks with four platforms.

The station has opened a toilet on 31 October 2019.

Station layout 

Outbound (Tung Chung-bound) passengers on the Tung Chung line can walk across the platform at Lai King to board the Tsuen Wan line trains for destinations in Kwai Chung and Tsuen Wan.

Those who are travelling to Central and Hong Kong Island from Kwai Chung and Tsuen Wan can transfer at Lai King, across the platform, for an express service on the Tung Chung line. Given both the Tsuen Wan line and Tung Chung line trains terminate at the Central & Hong Kong station complex, most passenger opt for the latter as it makes fewer stops. As a result, the station is often crowded at peak hours given the number of transfer passengers.

Entrances/exits
A1: Lai King Hill Road
A2: Yin Lai Court
A3: Lai King Estate
B: Kwai Chung Container Terminal 
C: HKEAA Lai King Assessment Centre

References

Lai King
MTR stations in the New Territories
Tsuen Wan line
Tung Chung line
Railway stations in Hong Kong opened in 1982
1982 establishments in Hong Kong